Holy Trinity Church, Tythby is a parish church in the Church of England in the English village of Tithby, Nottinghamshire. The building is Grade I listed.

History
Holy Trinity is a medieval church built in the 13th century in Early English style and rebuilt in the 18th century. It has a later bell tower in brick. The Georgian furnishings including a pulpit with reader's desk, box pews, squire's pew and west gallery. The bells and font are dated 1662. It has two east-facing stained-glass windows. On the gallery on the west side is a 19th-century organ.

Current parish status
Holy Trinity Church, Tythby is in the Wiverton group of parishes, which includes:
St Andrew's Church, Langar
St Giles's Church, Cropwell Bishop
All Saints' Church, Granby
St John's Church, Colston Bassett
St Mary's Church, Barnstone
St Michael and All Angels' Church, Elton on the Hill

Sources

External links

Church of England church buildings in Nottinghamshire
Grade I listed churches in Nottinghamshire
Diocese of Southwell and Nottingham